Bob Hewitt and Frew McMillan were the defending champions but lost in the final 6–4, 6–4 against Raymond Moore and Roscoe Tanner.

Seeds

Draw

Final

Top half

Bottom half

References
 1978 American Airlines Tennis Games Doubles Draw

American Airlines Tennis Games Doubles